Lemurorchis is a genus of flowering plants from the orchid family, Orchidaceae. It contains only one known species, Lemurorchis madagascariensis, an epiphyte endemic to Madagascar.

References

Kraenzlin, F.W.L. (1893) Botanische Jahrbücher für Systematik, Pflanzengeschichte und Pflanzengeographie 17: 58.
Berg Pana, H. (2005) Handbuch der Orchideen-Namen. Dictionary of Orchid Names. Dizionario dei nomi delle orchidee. Ulmer, Stuttgart
Pridgeon, A.M., Cribb, P., Chase, M.W. & Rasmussen, F.N. (Eds) (2014) Genera Orchidacearum Volume 6: Epidendroideae (Part 3); page 401 ff., Oxford: Oxford University Press.

External links

Monotypic Epidendroideae genera
Vandeae genera
Angraecinae
Orchids of Madagascar